Rigoletto... in Bluegrass is a 2006 Canadian independent film directed by Rob Swales, based on the 1851 opera Rigoletto by Giuseppe Verdi. Filming took place in Peterborough, Ontario, Canada, in 2005 and the film was first screened in 2006.

The plot takes the general form of Verdi's opera, but the character of the duke becomes Duke, the leader of a bluegrass band, played by eccentric multi-instrumentalist Washboard Hank. Most of the music from the original opera is adapted as bluegrass music, although the original "Prelude" and "Introduction" were performed in an orchestral arrangement by the Mandolin Society of Peterborough and recorded at the Peterborough Folk Festival.

Rigoletto... in Bluegrass was awarded Best Originality at the Bluegrass Independent Film Festival in La Grange, Kentucky.

Director: Rob Swales
Musical director: David E. Robertson
Composition: David E. Robertson, Rob Swales
Photographer: Candace Shaw
Editor: Lester Alfonso
Actors/musicians: Ron Mann, Melinda Wall, Washboard Hank, Mike Duguay, Mathias Kom, Ray Henderson, Johnny Chartrand, Mike Young, Benj Rowland, Esther Vincent, Caitlin Driscoll, Gene Jochen, Sarah Chartrand, Anya Gwynne, Ian Osborne

References

External links
Rigoletto... in Bluegrass Part 1
Bluegrass Independent Film Festival 2006

Canadian musical films
English-language Canadian films
Films based on operas
2006 films
2000s Canadian films